The Terrorism Confinement Center (abbreviated CECOT) is a prison located in Tecoluca, San Vicente, El Salvador. The prison was built from July 2022 to January 2023 amidst a large-scale gang crackdown; it opened in January 2023 and received its first 2,000 prisoners in February 2023. As of March 2023, the prison has a population of over 4,000 inmates. It has been described as a super prison and as one of the largest prisons in the world.

History 

In March 2022, the Salvadoran government began a large-scale crackdown against criminal gangs, which the government considers to be terrorist organizations. Due to the large number of alleged gang members being arrested by the country's security forces, the government announced in July 2022 that a new prison with a capacity of 40,000 would be built to house those who were arrested, as well as relieve El Salvador's overcrowded prisons, such as the Zacatecoluca prison. At the time of its opening, over 62,000 people had been arrested during the crackdown.

The prison, known as the Terrorism Confinement Center (CECOT), was opened by Salvadoran President Nayib Bukele in January 2023. In February 2023, Bukele tweeted a video showing the first 2,000 prisoners being transferred to the prison. On 15 March 2023, Bukele tweeted video showing another transfer of 2,000 inmates to the prison.

Prison facility 

It has a maximum capacity of 40,000—double the total population of the Marmara Penitentiaries Campus in Istanbul, Turkey—which would make it the largest in the world by total capacity. CECOT has been described as a "mega prison", a "super prison", and the "largest prison in Latin America".

Each cell contains only two toilets, two sinks, and 80 bunks with no mattresses for the more than 100 inmates assigned per cell. According to Financial Times, on average, each prisoner is given  of space. There are factories for the prisoners to produce fabric.

The prison is secured by 1,000 guards, 600 soldiers, and 250 police officers; there are 40 inmates per guard. Its nineteen guard towers—seven on the perimeter and twelve on the interior—are staffed by seven soldiers each.

Reactions 

Bukele has described the Terrorism Confinement Center as the "the most criticized prison in the world".

The prison's construction was criticized by the Farabundo Martí National Liberation Front (FMLN) and Vamos (V) political parties, stating that constructing universities and hospitals should take priority over constructing prisons. Human Rights Watch (HRW) criticized the prison for having such a high capacity, stating that the Standard Minimum Rules for the Treatment of Prisoners suggest a prison should not exceed a population higher than 500. Amnesty International criticized the government, stating that the prison doesn't "address the root causes of violence" and that it only allows the government to continue its "policy of mass incarceration".

After the prison accepted its first 2,000 inmates, Colombian President Gustavo Petro and some human rights experts claimed that the prison resembled a concentration camp. According to Martin Horn, a former New York City prison administrator, "forty thousand [prisoners] is too many to manage in one place, period. Under any circumstances". According to Gustavo Fondevila, a professor at the Center for Research and Teaching in Economics (CIDE), "what we're going to have is a gigantic prison that will become a small city of crime [...] for me, it's a political campaign project, the typical campaign project of pure, hard penal populism".

See also 

 Crime in El Salvador

References

Further reading 

 
 

Prisons in El Salvador